Ahamus altaicola is a species of moth of the family Hepialidae. It is found in China.

References

Moths described in 1990
Hepialidae
Moths of Asia